Yoenis Céspedes Milanés (born October 18, 1985), nicknamed "La Potencia" (The Power), is a Cuban-born professional baseball outfielder. He made his Major League Baseball (MLB) debut on March 28, 2012, for the Oakland Athletics, and has also played in MLB for the Boston Red Sox, Detroit Tigers and New York Mets. Primarily a left fielder in his early career, he split between left and center field on the Mets.

From Campechuela, Cuba, Céspedes played eight seasons until 2010 for the Alazanes de Granma in the Cuban National Series.  In that time, he batted .319, .404 on-base percentage (OBP), .565 slugging percentage (SLG), 169 home runs and 557 runs batted in (RBI) over 528 games.  He was also a member of the Cuba national team, winning gold medals in three tournaments. In MLB, he won the Home Run Derby in both 2013 and 2014.  He is a two-time All-Star, and in 2015, played in his first World Series as member of the National League champion Mets.

Early life
Céspedes was born in the small town of Campechuela, in Granma Province, Cuba. Céspedes is the son of Estela Milanés, a softball pitcher who appeared in the 2000 Summer Olympics for Cuba, and Cresencio Céspedes, a former Cuban League catcher who separated from Milanés when Yoenis was one year old. At age 10, he was sent by his mother to a state-run school where he could focus on baseball.

Cuban career
Before defecting, Céspedes' first name was generally spelled Yoennis. Céspedes debuted in the Cuban National Series with Granma during the 2003–04 Cuban National Series, hitting .302/.382/.503 (batting average, on-base percentage and slugging percentage). He was considered for the Cuban National Series Rookie of the Year Award, but lost out to Frank Montieth.

He batted .313/.403/.540 in the 2004–05 season.

In the 2005–06 season, he hit .351/.444/.649 with 23 home runs, 89 runs and 78 runs batted in (RBI) in 88 games played. He tied Yulieski Gurriel for the National Series lead in runs and was four home runs behind Gurriel for the lead, placing second. He tied for seventh in doubles (24), was second in total bases (220, 6 behind Gurriel) and was 4th in slugging. He hit .481/.481/.741 for Cuba in the 2006 Haarlem Baseball Week. Despite his strong performance, Cespedes was left off Cuba's roster for the inaugural World Baseball Classic in 2006. Joe Kehoskie, at the time an agent who followed Cuban baseball closely, told Toronto's The Globe and Mail that Cespedes was the best player left at home by Cuba.

He produced at a .303/.402/.541 rate in the 2006–2007 season with 17 home runs and 79 runs in 89 games. He again led in runs. He was also fifth in doubles (24), tied Yosvani Peraza for third in home runs, was fourth in total bases (184), tied Alfredo Despaigne for 4th in RBI, tied for 4th in steals (15) and was sixth in slugging. He was 1 for 7 with a steal and a run in the 2007 Pan-American Games in his debut for the Cuban national team.

He hit .284/.342/.552 in the 2007–08 season. He was among the league leaders in RBI (tying teammate Despaigne for third with 78), tied Urgellés for fourth in runs (82), was second in home runs (26, trailing only Alexei Bell) and fourth in 202 total bases.

He was the starting center fielder for Cuba in the 2009 World Baseball Classic. He hit .458/.480/1.000 with a double, 3 triples, 2 home runs, five runs and five RBI in six games. He led Cuba in slugging and was second to Frederich Cepeda in average, OBP and OPS. He tied Cepeda and Gurriel for the team lead in runs and tied Gourriel for second in homers, behind Cepeda. He broke a 1–1 tie against Australia with a 6th-inning solo homer off Damian Moss and started a 16–4 romp over Mexico with a leadoff triple against Pablo Ortega. Céspedes tripled off Hisashi Iwakuma in Cuba's last game of the tournament, a 5–0 loss to Japan, but did not score. Earlier in that game, he dropped a fly from Michihiro Ogasawara to let the first two Japanese runs score. Cuba thus missed the final four of an event for the first time ever; the Cuban team had also made the finals of every global baseball competition since 1959.

Céspedes batted .323/.411/.601 in the 2008–2009 season with 24 homers and 83 runs in 87 games. He tied Leonys Martín for 4th in the league in runs and tied Rolando Meriño for third in home runs (trailing Alfredo Despaigne and Joan Carlos Pedroso). He was 7th in total bases (197), 9th in RBI (76) and 10th in slugging. He made the All-Star outfield alongside Giorvis Duvergel and Despaigne.

He started the 2009 Baseball World Cup as Cuba's starting center fielder, but struggled and only hit .194/.275/.333 while being caught in his only steal attempt; Martín replaced him as the event went along. In the gold medal game, Céspedes pinch-hit for Yorbis Borroto successfully with a 9th-inning single off Brad Lincoln in Cuba's 10–5 loss to Team USA, settling for a silver medal.

He hit .345/.426/.617 in the 2009–2010 season with 87 runs and 22 homers in 87 contests. He was third in the league in runs (three behind Gurriel), 10th in hits (118), 8th in home runs, 4th in total bases (211, behind Alfredo Despaigne, Gourriel and José Abreu) and was ninth in slugging. He was not picked as an All-Star outfielder as Despaigne, Cepeda and Bell took the three slots.

He went 11 for 22 with 12 runs, 14 RBI, two doubles and four homers in six games at the 2010 World University Baseball Championship. He drove in six against South Korea and five against China. In the gold medal game, he was 0 for 4 with a strikeout as Cuba's fifth batter in a 4–3 win over Team USA. He made the tournament All-Star outfield alongside Mikie Mahtook and Shota Ishimine. He played for Cuba when it finished second in the 2011 Pan American Games Qualifying Tournament. In the 2010 Intercontinental Cup, he was 3 for 10 with a double, three runs, four RBI and a walk as a backup. In the 4–1 win over the Dutch national team in the gold medal game, he was the second of three left fielders Cuba used. He replaced Yoandry Urgellés, was retired by Berry van Driel and then replaced by Despaigne.

He put up a .333/.424/.667 batting line with 89 runs, 33 home runs and 99 RBI in 90 games in the 2010–2011 season. He led the league in runs (five ahead of Cepeda), tied Abreu for the home run lead (breaking Despaigne's league record by one), tied Cepeda for the most total bases (236), tied Ramon Tamayo for 7th in steals (11 in 14 tries), led in RBI (6 ahead of Abreu) and finished 5th in slugging. He was named the All-Star center fielder, joining Despaigne and Cepeda in the outfield.

Major League Baseball

In the summer of 2011, Céspedes and six others took a 23-hour speedboat ride departing Cuba and heading for the Dominican Republic. After arriving in the Dominican, he met Dominican agent Edgar Mercedes who established residency for him in Santiago which allowed him to bypass the MLB draft and become a free-agent.

Céspedes was considered a five-tool outfielder going into free agency. Kevin Goldstein of Baseball Prospectus declared Céspedes "arguably the best all-around player to come out of Cuba in a generation."

Oakland Athletics

2012
After interest from numerous Major League teams, Céspedes agreed to a 4-year, $36 million contract with the Oakland Athletics on February 13, 2012, with the deal becoming official the following month.
Céspedes began the 2012 season for the Athletics at his usual position of center field, but was later moved to left field upon the return of veteran center fielder Coco Crisp.

On March 28, in his major league debut, he went 1 for 3, and was also hit by a pitch. The following day, he hit his first major league home run, a 2-run shot off Seattle Mariners relief pitcher Shawn Kelley. Céspedes had hit his first walk-off home run on June 21 against the Los Angeles Dodgers with the final score of 4–1, resulting in a three-game sweep. The Athletics would go on to win the American League West, with Céspedes batting .316 with a .381 OBP in the postseason.

2013
On July 15, 2013, Céspedes won the 2013 Home Run Derby. A last-minute addition by team captain Robinson Canó to represent the American League squad, he hit 32 home runs total in the exhibition, including 17 in the first round. He defeated the National League's Bryce Harper in the final round by hitting 9 home runs, with five swings to spare. He was the first winner of the contest who had not been selected to that year's All-Star game. Céspedes hit .240 for the year and had 26 home runs along with 80 RBI's. Though Céspedes had a great postseason, the A's were eliminated by the Detroit Tigers. Céspedes suffered several injuries throughout the season, including wrist, hamstring, and knee injuries.

2014
Céspedes had a great start to the season, hitting .273 with 14 homers and 55 RBIs through July 1, and was 3rd in the All-Star Voting for the AL behind José Bautista of the Toronto Blue Jays and Mike Trout of the Los Angeles Angels of Anaheim.

Immediately Céspedes was noticed for throwing out runners. After getting 3 putouts against the Toronto Blue Jays and Baltimore Orioles, Céspedes gunned down Chris Iannetta and Kole Calhoun at home plate in the same inning in a game against the Angels on May 31. He would have an even more memorable throw, again against the Angels, when he threw out Howie Kendrick at home on June 10. Céspedes bobbled a hit off the bat of Mike Trout, causing Kendrick to attempt to run home. Céspedes corralled the ball and fired a 300-foot throw on the fly to nail Kendrick at the plate. He would once again terrorize Angel baserunners as he threw out Albert Pujols trying to advance to third when the ball got by Céspedes in the next game. This put Céspedes at 11 outfield assists on the season, which led the league.

On July 1, Céspedes suffered a hamstring injury while running against the Tigers on a RBI hit by Brandon Moss. Céspedes along with 5 other A's players (Josh Donaldson, Derek Norris, Brandon Moss, and pitchers Scott Kazmir and Sean Doolittle) were chosen to play in the 2014 MLB All-Star Game in Target Field. In the final week of fan voting to select starters for the All Star Game, he was passed by Adam Jones. On July 14, 2014, Céspedes won the Home Run Derby for a second time, becoming the first player to win consecutive Home Run Derby titles since Ken Griffey Jr. accomplished the feat in 1999. Céspedes played in the 2014 MLB All-Star Game where he went 0 for 2.

Boston Red Sox
On July 31, 2014, Céspedes was traded to the Boston Red Sox in exchange for pitcher Jon Lester and outfielder Jonny Gomes.

Céspedes hit his first home run as a member of the Red Sox on August 10, 2014, against the Los Angeles Angels, with a 3-run home run. In 51 games with Boston, Céspedes batted .269 with 5 home runs and 33 RBIs.  Overall, for the 2014 season, Céspedes had 22 home runs with 100 RBIs, while batting .260.

Detroit Tigers
On December 11, 2014, the Red Sox traded Céspedes along with Alex Wilson and Gabe Speier to the Detroit Tigers for Rick Porcello. Céspedes played his first game with the Tigers during opening day against the Minnesota Twins on April 6, 2015, where he robbed Kurt Suzuki of a home run, leading to a 4–0 victory for the Tigers. Through June 13, Céspedes was hitting .308 with 9 home runs and 33 runs batted in. He was not selected as an All Star but was put in as a player on the All-Star Final Vote. Therefore, he could not compete in the home run derby after winning the two previous years.

Céspedes won the American League Rawlings Gold Glove Award in left field. In 99 games for the Tigers, Céspedes had nine assists, 11 Defensive Runs Saved and a 15 Ultimate Zone Rating. He became only the second player in MLB history to win a Gold Glove Award after a mid-season trade between leagues, following Vic Power in 1964.

New York Mets

2015

On July 31, 2015, Céspedes was traded to the New York Mets for minor league pitchers Michael Fulmer and Luis Cessa. On August 21, Céspedes went 5 for 6 against the Colorado Rockies, hitting 3 home runs in a game for the first time. Céspedes finished a triple shy of the cycle. It was ranked the best offensive game of the season by ESPN.com. In his first 41 games with the Mets, Céspedes exploded, posting a .309 batting average, 17 home runs, 42 RBIs, and a .691 slugging percentage. His offensive explosion helped the Mets jump up to a 9.5 game lead over the Washington Nationals in the National League East as of September 14. Because of his efforts, Céspedes was awarded the NL Player of the Week Award for September 7 to the 13th. He batted .345, hit 4 home runs, scored 6 runs, and drove 12 RBI while posting a 1.263 OPS.

In Game 3 of the National League Division Series against the Los Angeles Dodgers, his three-hit, three-run, three-RBI performance, including a home run, helped the Mets take a 13–7 win and a 2–1 series lead. In Game 1 of the National League Championship Series against the Chicago Cubs, Céspedes threw Starlin Castro out at the plate, preserving a then 1–1 tie which the Mets won 4–2. In the sixth inning of Game 3, Céspedes caught the Cubs off-guard by stealing third base. He later scored the go-ahead run when Trevor Cahill's uncaught third strike allowed Michael Conforto to reach base safely.

The World Series started inauspiciously for Céspedes when Kansas City leadoff hitter Alcides Escobar hit Matt Harvey's first pitch to centerfield, and Céspedes misplayed the ball, then booted it into left field, resulting in the first World Series inside-the-park home run since 1929. The Royals would eventually take the series 4–1. For the Series, Céspedes batted .150 with no extra-base hits. At the end of the year, he became a free agent.

2016
On January 26, 2016, Céspedes re-signed with the Mets on a three-year, $75 million contract, with an opt-out after the first season.  On April 26, Céspedes came off the bench against the Cincinnati Reds in the 7th inning and hit a first-pitch pinch-hit three-run homer to tie the game at 3. He had previously sat out the last few games due to a lingering leg injury. The Mets eventually won 4–3. His  home run against the Chicago Cubs on June 30 tied for the longest in Citi Field history.

On July 5, Céspedes was named to the National League roster for the 2016 Major League Baseball All-Star Game at Petco Park, joining teammates Noah Syndergaard, Bartolo Colón, Jeurys Familia and Mets manager Terry Collins, but was later taken off the roster along with Syndergaard due to an injury. In August 2016, Céspedes was criticized for golfing while on the disabled list.

2017
Céspedes opted out of his contract with the Mets on November 3, 2016. The Mets then signed him to a four-year contract worth $110 million, with a no-trade clause on November 30, 2016.

On April 11, Céspedes hit three home runs in a single game as the Mets won 14–4 over the Phillies. On April 27, Cespedes left the game after pulling his left hamstring, and on the same day, he was placed on the 10-day disabled list. His season ended early on August 25 when he strained his right hamstring against the Washington Nationals. He finished the 2017 season with a .292 batting average and 17 home runs in 81 games played.

2018
After Spring Training ended, Céspedes spoke confidently about the 2018 Mets, claiming that they were the 'best team he had been around'. On April 18, against the Nationals, Céspedes capped off a nine-run inning for the Mets with a grand slam. Cespedes batted .262 with nine home runs and 29 RBIs in 38 games in 2018, as his season ended with him undergoing surgery on both heels which would result in him missing 8–10 months.

2019
On May 20, 2019, it was announced that Cespedes fractured his right ankle on his ranch, effectively ending his hopes of playing in 2019. He missed the entire season.

2020
Céspedes returned to major league action for the Mets' 2020 season opener against the Atlanta Braves at Citi Field. He hit a home run in a 1–0 victory, becoming the first designated hitter to hit a home run in a National League game. Céspedes, off to a .161 start to the shortened season, did not report to the Mets for their August 2 game; his agent announced during the game that Céspedes had opted out of the 2020 season, citing concerns regarding the COVID-19 pandemic. As a result, Céspedes ended his five-year tenure with Mets and became a free agent at the conclusion of the 2020 season.

Awards
Championships earned or shared
 3× Cuba national team gold medallist (2007 Pan Am Games, 2010 International Cup, 2010 World University)
 2× Home Run Derby champion (2013, 2014)
 National League champion (2015)

Awards
 All-World Baseball Classic Team (2009)
 American League Rookie of the Month (Sept. 2012)
 2× MLB All-Star (2014, 2016)
 2× MLB Player of the Week (July 15, 2012; September 13, 2015)
 Rawlings Gold Glove Award at left field (2015)
 Silver Slugger Award at outfield (2016)

Statistical leader
 Assists at outfield leader (2014)
 Total zone runs at left field leader (2015)

Personal life
Céspedes lives in Manhattan, New York, during the season, and has a ranch in Port St. Lucie, Florida during the off-season. He has a son, Yoenis Jr., whom he hasn't seen since he left Cuba, and is only able to speak to on the phone. He has tried to get him into the United States. He has a half-brother, Yoelkis.

In 2014, Céspedes signed with Jay-Z's Roc Nation Sports, a sports agency division of Roc Nation. An exotic car owner, Céspedes arrived to 2016 Mets spring training with a variety of custom sports cars on display. His collection includes a custom 2016 Ford F-250, two custom Polaris Slingshots, a custom Lamborghini Aventador, an Alfa Romeo 8C Competizione, and a custom Jeep Wrangler, all totaling a little under $1 million.

Cespedes also bought a 270-pound hog from a local county fair while at 2016 Mets spring training. He reportedly paid $7,000 for it.

See also

 Detroit Tigers award winners and league leaders
 List of baseball players who defected from Cuba
 List of Major League Baseball players from Cuba
 New York Mets award winners and league leaders

References

External links

1985 births
Living people
Alazanes de Granma players
American League All-Stars
Baseball players at the 2007 Pan American Games
Boston Red Sox players
Defecting Cuban baseball players
Detroit Tigers players
Gold Glove Award winners
Major League Baseball center fielders
Major League Baseball left fielders
Major League Baseball players from Cuba
Cuban expatriate baseball players in the United States
National League All-Stars
New York Mets players
Oakland Athletics players
Pan American Games gold medalists for Cuba
Pan American Games medalists in baseball
People from Campechuela
Sacramento River Cats players
Silver Slugger Award winners
2009 World Baseball Classic players
2023 World Baseball Classic players
Medalists at the 2007 Pan American Games
Binghamton Rumble Ponies players
Gulf Coast Mets players
St. Lucie Mets players
Cuban expatriate baseball players in the Dominican Republic
Águilas Cibaeñas players